Peter Cochran may refer to these notable people:

 Peter Cochran (soccer)
 Peter Cochran (politician)

See also 

 Peter Cochrane (disambiguation)